The 1914 Bucknell football team was an American football team that represented Bucknell University as an independent during the 1914 college football season. In its first and only season under head coach George Cockill, the team compiled a 4–4–1 record.

Schedule

References

Bucknell
Bucknell Bison football seasons
Bucknell football